The 1986 Kalamata earthquake struck the southern Peloponnese Region of Greece on September 13 at 20:24 local time. The earthquake was the result of normal faulting along a northwest-dipping fault and produced surface ruptures. Extensive damage was reported in Kalamata and Elaiochori. At least 20 people died and 330 were injured. Survivors sought refuge at campsites and reconstruction work lasted five years.

Tectonic setting

Greece is a seismically active country located in a complex zone of interaction between the African Plate the Aegean Sea. Shallow-focus earthquakes of less than  depth are common—the result of accommodating convergence via subduction-related deformation. Back-arc extension occurs within the Aegean Sea, above the subducting crust, causing normal and strike-slip faulting earthquakes. Large intermediate-depth earthquakes occur due to deformation within the subducting plate. The Peloponnese region is characterized by active extensional tectonics which has continued since the Pliocene. Present-day extension occurs in an east–west direction, accommodated by active north–south striking normal faults.

Kalamata is located at the border between the valley of Messinia and the Messenian Gulf which forms a graben. To the east is the Taygetus mountain range; separating it from the graben is a series of normal dip-slip faults, which are part of a seismic zone in West Mani. These faults generally trend north–south and accommodates east–west extension. One of them is the Kalamata Fault which strikes north northeast–south southwest and dips northwest at 70–80°. The Kalamata Fault is part of a group of west-dipping faults that separates the Taygetus mountains from the Pamisos river plain. Believed to have formed during the Quaternary, it was not associated with any earthquakes or surface ruptures prior to 1986. The region frequently experience earthquakes and their associated tsunamis and liquefaction such as in 1867 and 1947.

Earthquake
The earthquake's focal mechanism corresponded to normal faulting along the Kalamata Fault. The rupture area was determined to be  ×  (length × width) based on inferring its aftershock distribution. The fault ruptured to the surface along its northern extent, causing surface ruptures.

Surface rupture
These were observed for  along a north-northeast–south-southwest trend. Surface ruptures were intermittently accompanied by a fissure. These surface ruptures often appeared in terraced olive groves near rocky outcrops. They were several tens of centimeters west of a large fault surface (slickenside). Heavy damage occurred in homes where the surface rupture propagated beneath.

Strong ground motion

Two accelerographs in Kalamata recorded a maximum peak ground acceleration (pga) of 0.27 g in the horizontal component. Meanwhile, the pga in the veritcal component was 0.368 g. Pga exceeding 0.1 g lasted 2.5 seconds while the maximum horizontal velocity was /s. The greater Kalamata and Elaiochori regions were within the meizoseismal area. Downtown Kalamata experienced Modified Mercalli intensity VIII (Severe), where damage was heavy; 42 percent of homes were obliterated or had irreparable damage. In Elaiochori and Perivolakia, the Modified Mercalli intensity was X (Extreme) and both villages were razed. Seismic waves had short periods of 0.15–1.6 seconds, affecting short and poorly built structures. Structures in the village, poorly constructed and without retrofitting, were unable to endure the highly amplified shaking.

Aftershocks
Following the mainshock, seismic instruments were installed by the National Observatory of Athens, University of Athens, Institut de Physique du Globe de Paris and Grenoble Observatory. These instruments allowed scientists to determine the focal mechanism and depth of aftershocks. About 740 aftershocks were recorded in the first two weeks after the mainshock. Most aftershocks had focal mechanisms consistent with the mainshock (normal) while some were dextral strike-slip events on a fault perpendicular to the mainshock source. The largest aftershock on 15 September measured  5.3 and occurred south of the mainshock. It had a maximum intensity of VII (Very strong), caused 37 injuries, and further damage in Kalamata.

These aftershocks were distributed across a  ×  zone in two distinct clusters; north and south, separated by a zone without any. The lack of seismicity in the gap was the result of smooth rupturing along the fault. At  depth, the two aftershocks clusters merged. The southern sequence initiated immediately following the mainshock at the southern extension of the Kalamata Fault, releasing strain that still remained. The northern aftershock swarm experienced greater activity.

Impact

Total damage was estimated at €670 million. In Kalamata, four buildings were razed. Of the 9,124 buildings in the city, at least 20 percent of buildings sustained damage so extreme, they were demolished. A further 16 percent of buildings were heavily damaged, and in the other 36 percent, damage was moderate. The western part of Kalamata, despite its close proximity to the epicenter, was not as severely damaged. Forty four reinforced concrete buildings had to be torn down. An additional 289 mixed and 1,931 load-bearing masonry structures were also demolished.

The Metropolitan Church of Ypapanti was heavily damaged and had to be restored. It was the second time the church had been damaged by an earthquake, the previous one occurring in 1886. The dome and roof of the Church of Agioi Apostoloi collapsed. The church was previously damaged by an earthquake in 1884. The defensive towers of the Holy Monastery of Velanidia also collapsed.

Structures such as bridges and industrial facilities sustained little damage or were unaffected. Parts of the jetty walls partially detached. Power outages occurred and communication services were disrupted in Kalamata. Some rockfalls occurred in the Taygetus mountains, obstructing a major road that linked Kalamata to Sparta, Laconia.

The town suffered tremendous damage because it was located in the meizoseismal area. Extreme damage also occurred in the villages of Verga, Poliani, Aris, Artemisia and Nedousa.

Casualties
At least 20 people were killed—despite the severity of damage, the death toll was low because most residents attended a ferry line opening ceremony when the earthquake occurred. Six bodies were recovered from a five-story reinforced concrete apartment tower that collapsed. Six people died from falling roadside debris; one person was crushed, one died from a heart attack, an infant died from suffocation and another from serious injuries. Three individuals perished when the Holy Monastery of Velanidia's defensive towers collapsed. Four people died when an old stone building collapsed in Elaiochori. An additional 330 people were injured—83 in serious condition and immediate medical attention was required.

Aftermath
Rescuers immediately attended to two buildings in Kalamata; a collapsed apartment and another two-storey house where two people were trapped. They were accompanied by members of the Greek Army, Police and Fire Service. Rescuers pulled four survivors from the apartment building immediately. Another seven people were rescued the following afternoon. Rescue efforts were disrupted by curious onlookers, friends and family members of those trapped visiting the site. Rescue teams from France and Germany also assisted.

The reconstruction of basic infrastructures continued for five years under strict seismic codes. Many displaced individuals sought refuge across 30 campsites while their homes were reconstructed. Some residents left the city for other areas such as Athens.

See also
List of earthquakes in 1986
List of earthquakes in Greece

References

Sources

Further reading

1986 earthquakes
Earthquakes in Greece
1986 in Greece
Kalamata
History of Messenia
Geography of Messenia
1986 disasters in Greece